"Welcome to the World" is a song by Australian rock-pop band Noiseworks. It was released in November 1987 as the fourth single from their first studio album Noiseworks (1987) and peaked at number 41 on the Australian singles chart in January 1988. It was also released as a CD single, which was rather unique for an Australian band at the time.

Track listing
7" (651016 7)

 Live tracks recorded on 3 June 1987 at Selina's Sydney

Charts

References

External links
 "Noiseworks – Welcome to the World", Discogs.

Noiseworks songs
1987 songs
1987 singles
CBS Records singles
Songs written by Jon Stevens
Songs written by Justin Stanley
Songs written by Steve Balbi
Song recordings produced by Mark Opitz